"Special Kinda Love" is a single by The Jets, released on August 19, 1990. Written by Vassal Benford. It was released as a single from their greatest hits album, The Best of The Jets on the MCA label, the song was not nearly as successful as some other recordings by the group. It only reached number 83 on the R&B chart.

Chart performance

Reference

External links

1990 singles
The Jets (band) songs
Dance-pop songs
1990 songs
MCA Records singles
Songs written by Vassal Benford
Songs written by Ronald Spearman